Rukbanur Rahman is an Indian politician. In 2011 and 2016 he was elected as MLA of Chapra Vidhan Sabha Constituency in West Bengal Legislative Assembly. He is an All India Trinamool Congress politician.

References

Living people
Trinamool Congress politicians from West Bengal
West Bengal MLAs 2011–2016
Year of birth missing (living people)
West Bengal MLAs 2016–2021